Thomas Robins the Younger (1748–1806) was an English artist known for his depictions of English country houses, their gardens, and the natural world. His father, also Thomas Robins, was noted for his paintings of Gloucestershire gardens.

References

Further reading
Robins, John Anthony (Ed.) (1999) The Flower: Paintings of Thomas Robins the Younger (with commentaries on the insects by Robert Godden and on the plants by Adrian Whiteley)

External links 

http://www.radnorshire-fine-arts.co.uk/brand/robins-thomas-the-younger-active-in-bath-1750-70/

1748 births
1806 deaths